This is the List of municipalities in Çanakkale Province, Turkey .

References 

Geography of Çanakkale Province
Canakkale